The 4th European Badminton Championships were held in Vienna (Austria), between 18 and 20 April 1974, and hosted by the European Badminton Union and the Österreichischer Badminton Verband.

Medalists

Results

Semi-finals

Finals

Medal account

References
Results at BE

European Badminton Championships
European Badminton Championships
B
B
Badminton tournaments in Austria
1970s in Vienna
European Badminton Championships